Pierre Courcelle (16 March 1912 – 25 July 1980) was a French historian who was a specialist of ancient philosophy and of Latin Patristics, especially of St Augustine. He was elected to the American Philosophical Society in 1968.

References 

 Pierre Demargne, « Éloge funèbre de M. Pierre Courcelle », Comptes rendus de l'Académie des inscriptions et belles-lettres, 1980, pp. 508–511.
 Georges Folliet, « Pierre Courcelle, 1912–1980 », Revue des études augustiniennes, 26 (1980), pp. 204–206.
 Jean Doignon, « L'œuvre de Pierre Courcelle », Orpheus, nouv. sér., 2 (1981), pp. 1–5.
 Louis Carolus-Barré, « Pierre Courcelle (1912–1980) », Bibliothèque de l'École des chartes, 139–2, juillet-décembre 1981, pp. 346–349.
 Jacques Fontaine, Nécrologie, Annuaire de l'association des anciens élèves de l'École normale supérieure, 1981, pp. 86–90.
 Hervé Savon, « Pierre Courcelle 1912–1980 », Universalia 1981, Encyclopaedia Universalis, pp. 542–543.
 Antoine Guillaumont, « Pierre Courcelle (16 mars 1912–25 juillet 1982) », Annuaire du Collège de France 1980–1981, 1981, pp. 59–60.
 « In memoriam : Pierre Courcelle (1912–1980) », Augustinus, 27, 1982, pp. 123–125.
 Béatrice et Michel Wattel, Qui était qui, xxe siècle : dictionnaire biographique des Français disparus ayant marqué le xxe siècle, Levallois-Perret, J. Lafitte, 2005.

1912 births
1980 deaths
Corresponding Fellows of the British Academy
Patristic scholars
20th-century French historians
French historians of philosophy
Scholars of ancient philosophy
École Nationale des Chartes alumni
École Normale Supérieure alumni
Members of the American Philosophical Society
Academic staff of the University of Paris
Members of the Académie des Inscriptions et Belles-Lettres
Officiers of the Légion d'honneur
Commandeurs of the Ordre des Palmes Académiques
Recipients of the Order of Merit of the Italian Republic
Academic staff of the Collège de France